Plocama thymoides is a species of flowering plant in the family Rubiaceae. It is endemic to the Socotra archipelago of Yemen, where it occurs in semi-deciduous woodland habitat. It is listed as an endangered species by the IUCN under the basionym Gaillonia thymoides.

References

Endemic flora of Socotra
thymoides
Taxa named by Isaac Bayley Balfour
Taxobox binomials not recognized by IUCN